The 72nd annual Venice International Film Festival took place from 2 to 12 September 2015. Alfonso Cuarón served as the President of the Jury for the main competition. A restored version of Federico Fellini's film Amarcord was shown at the festival. The Venezuelan film From Afar by Lorenzo Vigas won the Golden Lion award.

Everest was selected as the festival's opening night film, while Guan Hu's drama film Mr. Six served as the closing night film. Actress and director Elisa Sednaoui hosted the opening and closing ceremonies of the festival.

The festival poster featured Nastassja Kinski in front as reminiscent of Wim Wenders's Faraway, So Close!, while in the background it featured the character of Antoine Doinel portrayed by Jean-Pierre Léaud from François Truffaut's 1959 drama film The 400 Blows, which also appeared on the 71st Venice International Film Festival poster.

The festival honoured Brian De Palma with Glory to the Filmmaker Award and a documentary film titled De Palma by Noah Baumbach and Jake Paltrow also screened at the festival. Jonathan Demme received the Persol Tribute to Visionary Talent Award, who also served as the President of Horizons (Orizzonti) section jury.

Juries
The following people formed the 2015 juries:

Main competition (Venezia 72)
Alfonso Cuarón, Mexican director (Jury President)
Elizabeth Banks, American actress and director
Diane Kruger, German actress
Emmanuel Carrère, French author, screenwriter and director 
Nuri Bilge Ceylan, Turkish director
Pawel Pawlikowski, Polish director
Francesco Munzi, Italian director
Hou Hsiao-hsien, Taiwanese director
Lynne Ramsay, Scottish director and screenwriter

Horizons (Orizzonti)
Jonathan Demme, American director  (President) 
Alix Delaporte, French director and screenwriter 
Paz Vega, Spanish actress 
Fruit Chan, Hong Kong director
Anita Caprioli, Italian actress

Opera Prima (Venice Award for a Debut Film)
Saverio Costanzo, Italian director  (President)
Roger Garcia, Hong Kong producer
 Natacha Laurent, French film critic and historian 
Charles Burnett, American director
 Daniela Michel, Mexican journalist

Official selection

In Competition
The following films were selected for the main competition:

Highlighted title indicates the Golden Lion winner.

Out of competition
The following films were selected to be screened out of competition:

Horizons
The following feature films were selected for the Horizons (Orizzonti) section:

Highlighted title indicate the Orizzonti Awards for Best Feature Film and Best Short Film respectively.

Venice Classics
The following selection of restored classic films and documentaries on cinema were screened for this section:

Highlighted titles indicate the Best Restored Film and Best Documentary on Cinema official awards respectively.

Biennale College - Cinema
The following films were screened for the "Biennale College - Cinema" section, a higher education training workshop for micro-budget feature films:

Final Cut in Venice
The following films were screened for the "Final Cut in Venice" section, a workshop to support the post-production of films from Africa:

Il Cinema nel Giardino
The following feature films were selected for the Il Cinema nel Giardino section:

Autonomous sections

International Critics’ Week
The following films were selected for the 29th Venice International Film Critics' Week:

Venice Days
The following films were selected for the 12th edition of the Venice Days (Giornate degli Autori) section:

Highlighted title indicates the official Venice Days Award winner.

Awards

Official selection
The following Official Awards were presented at the 72nd edition:

In Competition (Venezia 72)
Golden Lion: From Afar by Lorenzo Vigas
Silver Lion for Best Director: Pablo Trapero for The Clan
Grand Jury Prize: Anomalisa by Charlie Kaufman and Duke Johnson
Volpi Cup for Best Actor: Fabrice Luchini for Courted
Volpi Cup for Best Actress: Valeria Golino for Per amor vostro
Marcello Mastroianni Award: Abraham Attah for Beasts of No Nation
Best Screenplay Award: Christian Vincent for Courted
Special Jury Prize: Frenzy by Emin Alper

Horizons (Orizzonti)
Best Film: Free in Deed by Jake Mahaffy
Best Director: Brady Corbet for The Childhood of a Leader
Special Jury Prize: Neon Bull by Gabriel Mascaro
Special Prize For Best Actor or Actress: Dominique Leborne for Tempête
Horizons Prize for Best Short: Chatting by Lonce Marlonce

Lion of the Future 
Luigi De Laurentiis Award for a Debut Film: The Childhood of a Leader by Brady Corbet (Horizons)

Venice Classics Awards
Best Documentary on Cinema: The 1000 Eyes of Dr. Maddin by Yves Montmayeur
Best Restored Film: Salò, or the 120 Days of Sodom by Pier Paolo Pasolini

Special Awards
Golden Lion For Lifetime Achievement: Bertrand Tavernier
Jaeger-LeCoultre Glory to the Filmmaker Award: Brian De Palma
Persol Tribute To Visionary Talent Award: Jonathan Demme
L'Oréal Paris per il Cinema Award: Valentina Corti

Autonomous sections
The following official and collateral awards were conferred to films of the autonomous sections:

30th Venice International Critics' Week 
Audience Award Pietro Barzisa: Tanna by Bentley Dean and Martin Butler
 Fedeora Awards (Critics' Week):
Best Film: The Black Hen by Min Bahadur Bham
Best Cinematography: Bentley Dean for Tanna

Venice Days
Venice Days Award: Early Winter by Michael Rowe
BNL People's Choice Award: As I Open My Eyes by  Leyla Bouzid
Europa Cinemas Label Award for Best European Film: As I Open My Eyes by  Leyla Bouzid 
Laguna Sud Award:
Best Film: Lolo directed by Jullie Delpy
Best Italian Discovery: Arianna directed by Carlo Lavagna
 Francesco Pasinetti (SNGCI) Award - Special mentions:
First Light (La prima luce) by Vincenzo Marra
Vincenzo Marra (director) and Riccardo Scamarcio (leading actor) for First Light
 Fedeora Awards (Venice Days):
Best Film: Underground Fragrance directed by Pengfei 
Best Director of a Debut Film: Ruchika Oberoi for Island City
Best Actress in a Debut Film: Ondina Quadri for Arianna

Other collateral awards
The following collateral awards were conferred to films of the official selection:
 FIPRESCI Awards
Best Film (Main competition): Blood of My Blood (Sangue del mio sangue) by Marco Bellocchio
Best Film (Horizons): Wednesday, 9 May (Chaharshanbeh, 19 Ordibehesht) by Vahid Jalilvand
Special mention: The Childhood of a Leader by Brady Corbet
 SIGNIS Award: Behemoth (Bei xi mo shou) by Zhao Liang
Special mention: The Wait (L'attesa) by Piero Messina
 Francesco Pasinetti (SNGCI) Award:
Best Film: Don't Be Bad (Non essere cattivo) by  Claudio Caligari
Best Actor: Luca Marinelli for Don't Be Bad (Out of competition) 
Best Actress: Valeria Golino for For Your Love
 Leoncino d'Oro Agiscuola Award: The Wait (L'attesa) by Piero Messina
 Brian Award: Spotlight by Tom McCarthy
 Queer Lion: The Danish Girl by Tom Hooper
Special mention: Baby Bump by Kuba Czekaj
 Arca CinemaGiovani Award:
Best Film of Venezia 72: Frenzy by Emin Alper
Best Italian Film: Burning Love (Pecore in erba) by Albert Caviglia (Horizons)
FEDIC Award: Don't Be Bad directed by Claudio Caligari (Out of competition)
Special mention: The Wait directed by Piero Messina
 Fedeora Awards - Best Euro-Mediterranean film: Francofonia directed by Alexander Sokurov
 Fondazione Mimmo Rotella Award: Alexander Sokurov for Francofonia
Special Award: Johnny Depp and Terry Gilliam
 2nd Starlight Cinema Awards
Career Award: Lina Wertmuller
International Award: Paz Vega
Best Film: Matteo Garrone's Tale of Tales
Best breakthrough actress of the year: Silvia D’Amico
Best breakthrough actor of the year: Giovanni Anzaldo
Humanitarian Award: Myriam Catania
Special Mention: Lucana Film Commission
Best breakthrough production: Buena Onda by Riccardo Scamarcio
Intercultural Award: Reynaldo Gianecchini
 Green Drop Award: Behemoth directed by Zhao Liang
 Vittorio Veneto Film Festival Young Jury award: Remember directed by Atom Egoyan
Special mention: 11 Minutes directed by Jerzy Skolimowski
 Gold Mouse: Rabin, the Last Day directed by Amos Gitai
 Silver Mouse: Spotlight directed by Tom McCarthy
 Future Film Festival Digital Award: Anomalisa by Charlie Kaufman and Duke Johnson
Special mention: Heart of a Dog by Laurie Anderson
 P. Nazareno Taddei Award: Marguèrite by Xavier Giannoli
 Lanterna Magica (CGS) Award: Blanka by Kohki Hasei
 Open Award: Carlotta Cerquetti for Harry’s Bar
 Lina Mangiacapre Award: Laurie Anderson for Heart of a Dog
 Gillo Pontecorvo - Arcobaleno Latino Award: Don't Be Bad by Claudio Caligari
 INTERFILM Award: Wednesday, 9 May by Vahid Jalilvand
 "Civitas Vitae prossima" Award: Alberto Caviglia for Pecore in erba
 Soundtrack Stars Award:
A Bigger Splash by Luca Guadagnino
Equals by Drake Doremus
Award for Lifetime Achievement: Nicola Piovani
 Schermi di Qualità – Carlo Mazzacurati Award: Don't Be Bad by Claudio Caligari
 Human Rights Nights Award: Rabin, the Last Day by Amos Gitai
 AssoMusica "Ho visto una Canzone" Award: The song "A cuor leggero" by Riccardo Sinigallia, from the film Don't Be Bad 
 Sorriso diverso Venezia 2015 Award
Best Italian film: Don't Be Bad by Claudio Caligari
Best Film in a Foreign Language: Blanka by Kohki Hasei
 Amnesty International Italia "Il cinema per i diritti umani" Award: Visaranai by Vetrimaaran
 CITC – UNESCO 2015 Award: Beasts of No Nation by Cary Fukunaga
 NuovoImaie Talent Award:
Best Actress in a Debut Film: Ondina Quadri for Arianna 
Best Italian actor in a Debut Film: Alessandro Borghi for Don't Be Bad
 Best Innovative Budget Award: A Bigger Splash by Luca Guadagnino

References

External links

72
2015 film festivals
2015 festivals in Europe
2015 in Italian cinema
Film
September 2015 events in Italy